Lilla is a small city and union council of Jhelum District in the Punjab Province of Pakistan. It is part of Pind Dadan Khan Tehsil.

Lilla is also known as Lilla Town and Lilla Shareef. Lilla has four small parts: Lilla Bherwana, Lilla Bhera, Lilla Hindwana and Lilla Gujj.

Independence 

The predominantly Muslim population supported the Muslim League and Pakistan Movement. After the independence of Pakistan in 1947, the minority Hindus and Sikhs migrated to India while Muslim refugees from India settled down in Lilla and nearby areas.

Location 

It lies about two miles away from the M-2 motorway, which connects Lahore and Islamabad. It is connected to the M-2 by the Lilla Interchange. Directly connected by the M-2 motorway are Lahore, Islamabad, and the route to Khusab, Johrabad, Chakwal and Sargodha.

Topography 

Lilla mainly comprises flat, fertile plains, although here are a high hills on the Peer Khara and Kallar Kahar Road. The River Jhelum flows on the western and northern sides.

Climate 

The village has a climate of extreme heat in the summers and moderate cold in the winters.

However, westerly disturbances also bring quite significant rainfall in the winter.

The biggest floods in Jhelum in recent years were in 1992. Jhelum city and surrounding areas were almost completely submerged under flood waters.

Demographics 
The majority of the people in the village speak Punjabi.

Historical places 
 Darbar Hazrat Khawja Faiz Bakhsh Chishti Nizami 
 Darbar Peer Hazrat Lillahi
 Peer Kahara
 Kakiya Wali Sarkar
 Miana khoh

Sites

Mosques 
There are four main mosques and about 30 small mosques in the village.

Schools 
 Govt Higher Secondary School 
 Govt girls high school                                                                                         
 Al Ghazali High School
 Dar-e-Arqam Schools
 The Sufa Grammar

Madrasa and darbars 
 Astana Aliya Chistia Nizamia Sulemania
 Darbar Hazrat Khawja Faiz Bakhsh Chishti Nizami R.A
 Astaniya Aliya Lilla Shareef Madrasa
 Darbar Peer Hazrat Lillahi R.A
 Darbar Sindhan Badshah R.A
 Darbar Bawa Sakhi Gulam Sarwar Qadri R.A
 Darbar Peer Khara Sharif
 Mazaar Sharif Majzob Hazrat Qaim deen Bra dar e Akbar Alla hazrat 
 Mazaar Sharif Qazi Hassan Deen
 Mazaar sharif badshah bukhari lilla behra

Transportation 

It is also connected to other cities including Pind Dadan Khan, Jhelum, Chakwal, Khushab, Sargodha and Mianwali by a highway. Bus services drive regular routes from Lilla to the rest of the country.

Lilla is also connected by the rest of the country by rail.

Notable people 

 Khalid Masud, chemical engineer
 Nasir Mehmood, politician PMLN, MPA PP27Capt Malik Ghulam Muhammad Shaheed
 Doctor Riaz Lilla, politician qualified surgeon</ref>

References 

Populated places in Tehsil Pind Dadan Khan
Union councils of Pind Dadan Khan Tehsil
Pind Dadan Khan Tehsil